Ballera Airport  is located at the Ballera gas plant in the locality of Durham in southwestern Queensland, Australia.

Airlines and destinations

See also
 List of airports in Queensland
 aerial shot of Ballera Airfield
 photo of Ballera Airfield Terminal

References

Airports in Queensland